François Mathy (born 31 December 1944) is a Belgian equestrian and Olympic medalist. He was born in Brussels. He competed in show jumping at the 1976 Summer Olympics in Montreal, and won a bronze medal with the Belgian team, as well as a bronze medal in the individual contest.

References

1944 births
Living people
Belgian male equestrians
Olympic equestrians of Belgium
Olympic bronze medalists for Belgium
Equestrians at the 1972 Summer Olympics
Equestrians at the 1976 Summer Olympics
Olympic medalists in equestrian
Medalists at the 1976 Summer Olympics
Sportspeople from Brussels
20th-century Belgian people